Heaven Sent is an album by the post-punk group Half Japanese, released in 1997.

The title track, over sixty minutes long, was a live recording for a radio broadcast on Radio 5 VPRO's De Avonden. The other nine tracks on the album are one-minute tracks.

Critical reception
The A.V. Club gave the album a mixed review, describing the title track as intermittently "kind of cute" but also "impossible to listen to in its entirety." The Austin Chronicle called it "precisely the sort of ambitious, sprawling project that would send all but the most adventurous label honchos into cardiac arrest."

Track listing

References 

1997 albums
Half Japanese albums